Eslamabad Rural District may refer to:
 Eslamabad Rural District (Gilan Province)
 Eslamabad Rural District (Jiroft County), in Kerman Province
 Eslamabad Rural District (Zarand County), in Kerman Province